The Walls of Delhi is a novel by Indian writer Uday Prakash. It was translated into English by Jason Grunebaum. Novel tells three stinging and comic tales of living and surviving in today's urban, globalised India. Author portrays the realities about caste and class, and there is a charming and compelling authenticity in his stories. The Walls of Delhi was shortlisted for the DSC Prize for South Asian Literature (2013), and was a 2013 Jan Michalski Prize for Literature finalist.

References

Indian English-language novels
Novels set in Delhi
2012 Indian novels